This is a list of Russian military accidents that befell the Russian Armed Forces after the fall of the Soviet Union in 1991. Accidents have variously been attributed to cutbacks in spending on equipment, the lack of maintenance of hardware, and the theft of parts for sale to criminal gangs due to low pay in the services. For accidents involving the Russian Air Force during the Second Chechen War, see List of Russian aircraft losses in the Second Chechen War.

1990s

1992 
7 February - A MiG-29 crashed due to adverse weather conditions on a routine training flight. Pilot General Major Sulanbek Oskanov was killed.

1993 
24 July – Two Mig-29s of the Russian Air Force collided in mid-air and crashed away from the public during the Royal International Air Tattoo at RAF Fairford, Gloucestershire, England, United Kingdom. No one on the ground sustained any serious injuries, and the two pilots ejected and landed safely.
23 August - Some 40 minutes after takeoff from Engels Air Force Base in Saratov Oblast, An An-12 suffered a partial failure of the electrical system. At an altitude of 4800 m engines number 2 and 3 failed. The crew began an emergency descent for landing at the nearest airfield which was Gurmak. Descending through 1700 m engine number 1 failed. The crew decided to carry out a forced landing. It collided with a tree, crashed and burned.

1994 
18 January – After takeoff, an Antonov An-22 reported control problems. The aircraft rolled to the right and crashed near Antonovo, Tver Oblast. Three occupants were seriously injured while seven others were killed.
13 July – A An-26 was stolen from Kubinka airbase, Moscow Oblast by an engineer planning to commit suicide. He circled Lyakhovo at 300–2000 feet until the aircraft ran out of fuel and crashed, killing him.
5 August – An Antonov An-12 airplane impacted a hilltop at 140 metres due to poor visibility at Bada, Chita Oblast.
1994 –  Four conscripts in the Pacific Fleet died of a stomach infection due to malnutrition.

1995 
22 September – A nuclear submarine had its electricity cut by an electricity company at a naval base due to unpaid bills. The submarine's cooling system ceased to function and the reactor "came close to meltdown".
12 December - 2 Su-27s and a Su-27UB of the Russian Knights flight demonstration team crashed into terrain outside of Cam Ranh, Vietnam, killing four team pilots.

1997 
5 December – Russian Air Force Antonov An-124 Ruslan, RA-82005, delivering two Sukhoi Su-27 Flankers to Vietnam, loses both port engines at 200 feet (60 m) on take-off from Irkutsk, crashing into residential area, killing eight crew, 15 passengers, and 45 on the ground (some accounts list higher ground casualties). Cause was thought to be either contaminated fuel or wrong grade of fuel, taken on at Irkutsk.

1998 
17 June – A Kamov Ka-50 Hokum crashes at Army Aviation Combat Training Centre, Torzhok, Tver Oblast, killing Army Major-General Boris Vorobyov.

1999 
22 April – A Russian Air Force Sukhoi Su-24 MR Fencer disappeared from radar at 1140 hrs. while descending through cloud during a coastal surveillance flight along the Black Sea in Krasnodar Krai. Its wreckage was found ≈9 miles (15 km) from Novorossiysk and 25 miles (40 km) from Anapa. Both crew did not eject and are killed.
13 June –  A prototype of  the Sukhoi Su-30 crashed during a demonstration at the opening of the 43rd Paris Air Show.

2000s

2000 
16 June – A fuel leak from a missile poisoned 11 servicemen at a naval base in Primorsky Krai. 
25 October – A Russian Air Force Ilyushin Il-18 crashes near Batumi, Georgia killing all 86 people on board.

2001 
27 January – An Antonov An-70 prototype crashed close to Omsk Tsentralny Airport during testing of the aircraft. All 33 passengers and crew on board the aircraft survive.
17 July - A Su-33 crashed during an air show in Pskov Oblast. The pilot, Major-General Timur Apakidze, died in the crash.
1 December – A Russian military Ilyushin Il-76TD catches fire and crashes near Novaya Inya, Khabarovsk Krai killing all 18 on board.

2002 
21 February – A Russian Navy Antonov An-26, crashes 1.5 km short of runway at Lakhta Airfield, near Archangelsk, during an emergency landing. Of the 20 people on board, 17 were killed.

2003 
30 August – The decommissioned November-class nuclear-powered submarine K-159 sank while it was being towed to Polyarny, Murmansk Oblast in the Barents Sea to be stripped of its nuclear reactors. Nine crew members died.
18 September – A TU-160 strategic bomber crashed in Engels-2. The crash occurred near Sovetskoye, Saratov oblast. All four crew members were killed in the accident.

2005 
5 August – AS-28, under the command of Lieutenant Vyacheslav Milashevskiy, became entangled with the aerial of a hydrophone array off the coast of Kamchatka, in Berezovaya Bay, 70 km southeast of Petropavlovsk-Kamchatskiy. The aerial, anchored by 60-tonne concrete blocks, snared the propeller of the submarine, and the submarine then sank to the seafloor at a depth of 190 m (600 ft). This was too deep for the ship's complement of seven to leave the submarine and swim to the surface. On August 7, all seven sailors were rescued with the help of the United States Navy and the Royal Navy
6 September – During maneuvers of the Northern Fleet, in the northern Atlantic, a Su-33 fell in the water during landing on aircraft carrier Admiral Kuznetsov. The pilot was able to catapult himself and survived.
15 September – A Sukhoi Su-27 Flanker of the 6th Air Force, 177th Fighter Regiment, during a flight between St. Petersburg and Kaliningrad, for unknown reasons veers off its course while travelling over neutral waters of the Baltic Sea, enters Lithuanian airspace and crashes in Jurbarkas region, Lithuania. No one is harmed during the incident, and pilot Maj. Velery Troyanov ejects safely.

2006 
7 September – a fire broke out in the submarine, Daniil Moskovsky, as it was being towed across the Barents Sea to Vidyayevo, Murmansk Oblast. Two on board died.

2008 
20 March - A Su-25 exploded in mid-air during a live firing exercise over Primorsky Krai, 143 km from Vladivostok, killing the pilot. Further investigations revealed that the aircraft was downed by a missile accidentally launched by a wingman.
15 July – Seven soldiers died and six were injured in Chechnya when a tank shell they were loading exploded unexpectedly.
8 November – The Akula II-class submarine K-152 Nerpas freon fire extinguishing system was accidentally activated, killing 20 and injuring at least 22 people. The incident occurred while the submarine was conducting sea trials off the Russian Pacific coast.
17 October – A MiG-29 crashed in Chita Oblast causing the fleet to be grounded temporarily.
5 December – A MiG-29 lost part of its tail section due to corrosion and crashed in southern Siberia. The whole fleet was grounded for inspection and 90 planes were found to be in a dangerous condition.

2009 
7 January – A small fire broke out on board the aircraft carrier Admiral Kuznetsov while anchored off Turkey. The fire, caused by a short circuit, led to the death of one crew member from carbon monoxide poisoning. On 16 February 2009, along with other Russian naval vessels, she was involved in a large oil spill while refueling off the south coast of Ireland.
15 January – 2 Ilyushin Il-76MDs collided in Dagestan after one of them tried to make a landing with low visibility. there was a total of 11 fatalities and one plane was damaged beyond repair while the other suffer sustantial damaged.
11 February - An Antonov An-2 airplane suffered a loss in engine power while climbing through an altitude of about 50-70 metres. The pilot was had to carry out a forced landing because he could not reach the airport at Pskov. The airplane came down in a wooded area. There were three crew members and ten paratroopers on board. All survived. 
March – A fire broke out on the hull of the decommissioned nuclear submarine Orenburg, a Delta III-class submarine while at the Severodvinsk docks in Arkhangelsk Oblast.
26 April – The fourth Su-35BM prototype was destroyed in a high-speed taxi run due to brake failure. The aircraft crashed into the barrier at the end of the runway at Dzyomgi Airport, Khabarovsk Krai and was destroyed. The pilot ejected and sustained burn injuries.
4 May – A Kamov Ka-27 Helicopter landing on the frigate Yaroslav Mudry, crashed on the deck and then rolled over the side into the Baltic Sea. The 5 crew from the helicopter were successfully rescued.
17 June – A Sukhoi Su-24MR Fencer crashes on landing at the Monchegorsk Air Base, Murmansk Oblast. The aircraft from the 98th Separate Reconnaissance Aviation Regiment suffered a heavy landing forcing the 2 crew to eject safely
19 June – A Sukhoi Su-24MR Fencer crashes near the village of Kostino-Bystrianská, Rostov-on-Don, Rostov Oblast. The aircraft from the 1st Composite Air Division, North Caucasus Military District suffered a mechanical fault forcing the 2 crew to eject safely after several aborted landings. 
16 August – Two Russian Knights air display Sukhoi Su-27 jets collide whilst training, killing one pilot, Igor Tkachenko, and injuring 5 civilians on the ground. The accident occurred near Zhukovsky Airfield, outside of Moscow.
October – Another blaze occurred during the decommissioning of the nuclear submarine, Kazan at Severodvinsk.
1 November – An Ilyushin Il-76 belonging to the Russian Ministry of Interior crashed shortly after takeoff in Sakha Republic. The 11 crewmembers died.
6 November – A Russian Naval Aviation Tupolev Tu-142 M3 from the 310th Independent Long Range Anti-Submarine Aviation Regiment based at Kamenny Ruchey Airbase, Khabarovsk Krai crashed on a routine training exercise into the Tatar Strait near Sakhalin island 15–20 km from the coast off Cape Datta north of Sovetskaya Gavan with the loss of all 11 crew.
14 November – Explosion on the outskirts of Ulyanovsk at Arsenal 31, a navy depot. Two firemen died during the decommissioning of munitions.
23 November – Second explosion at Arsenal 31. Eight soldiers died as they removed munitions.

2010s

2010 

 14 January – A Sukhoi Su-27 crashed near Komsomolsk-on-Amur, Khabarovsk Krai. Pilot killed.
February – A blaze broke out on the decommissioned nuclear submarine K-480 Ak Bars, at Severodvinsk. Casualties unknown.

2011  

26 May – Explosion in an arms depot in the village of Urman in Bashkortostan. 12 people were injured and 40 buildings damaged. Over 2,000 people were evacuated from the surrounding area. The cause was blamed by an official on the "combustion of gunpowder traces".
2 June – Explosion in an arms depot near Izhevsk, Udmurtia. 20,000 inhabitants of the surrounding area had to be evacuated. 95 people were injured in the blast, and two elderly people nearby died of heart attacks possibly caused by the sound of the blast. Windows were shattered up to 10 km away. A discarded cigarette has initially been blamed for the blast.
6 September – A MiG-31 on a training mission crashed in Perm Krai, killing the two pilots. The whole fleet of 370 fighters was grounded while an investigation into the cause was carried out.
29 December – The Delta-IV-class nuclear submarine, Ekaterinburg, caught fire while in dry-dock in the Roslyakovo shipyard, north of Murmansk. The blaze broke out on scaffolding that had been erected around it. The rubber outer hull was badly burnt and nine people were injured fighting the fire. No radiation leak was detected.

2012 

13 March – A new Ka-52 attack helicopter crashed near Torzhok, Tver Oblast, killing both pilots.
2 May – Explosion at a military training centre near Nizhny Novgorod killed six soldiers.
23 May – A Russian An-30 military plane crashed while landing in Caslav, Czech Republic. 23 were on board at the time, six of whom suffered burns, with one being left in a critical condition. The plane's front landing gear collapsed as it touched down, causing it to leave the runway and break in two, catching fire. The passengers were made up of 14 Russians and nine Czechs, all on an Open Sky treaty mission, for conducting surveillance flights over the territory of participant nations (NATO members, Russia and other countries).
6 September – A Mikoyan MiG-29 crashed into a hill near Chita in the Siberian Military District killing the pilot, all Mig-29 flying was suspended.
8 September – A Mil Mi-35 crashed into a mountain in bad weather in the Republic of Dagestan, all four on board killed.
26 September – Explosion at an arms depot 180 km northwest of Orenburg killed one officer.
30 October - A Su-24M crashed in Chelyabinsk Oblast. During the flight the nose cone fractured. After attempting an emergency landing, the crew of two flew to open territory and safely ejected.
October – Explosion at an arms depot in Orenburg Oblast . 4,000 tons of munitions exploded when a soldier failed to extinguish his cigarette. One officer was injured and inhabitants of the surrounding area had to be evacuated.

2013 

12 March – A United Nations Mil Mi-8 with a crew of four Russians crashed near Bukavu, Democratic Republic of the Congo, all crew members were killed.
16 March – A Russian Federal Border Guard Service Mil Mi-8MN crashed at Khankala Air Base in Chechnya in low visibility, three of the four crew killed.
18–19 June – Explosion at the Chapaevsk arms depot in Samara Oblast. 6,000 inhabitants of the surrounding area had to be evacuated. 30 people were injured in the blast caused by the "involuntary" explosion of shells.
 16 September – 15 sailors were injured after a fire broke out on the nuclear submarine K-150 Tomsk at a shipyard near Vladivostok. Officials claimed the nuclear reactor was "deactivated" prior to the fire.
23 September – A Sukhoi Su-25 crashed during a training mission in Krasnodar Krai, pilot ejected but was killed.
22 October – Explosion at a firing range near Strugi Krasnye, Pskov Oblast, killed six soldiers – 5 cadets from the Ryazan Higher Airforce Institute, and one sergeant from Pskov. Two others were injured. It is thought that one of them stepped on unexploded ordnance.
29 October – A Ka-52 helicopter crashed south-east of Moscow. Both pilots ejected safely.

2014 

11 February – A Su-24 bomber crashed in Volgograd Oblast just after take-off. Both pilots died. Pilot or mechanical error are suspected.
14 July – A Sukhoi Su-57 prototype aircraft suffered an in-flight emergency and was severely damaged by an engine fire after landing at Zhukovsky airbase outside Moscow. The pilot managed to escape unharmed.

2015 
7 April – Orel, an Oscar II-class submarine, caught fire during repairs in a dry dock in the Severodvinsk shipyard. No casualties have been reported and the nuclear reactor had been turned off before the fire started. The submarine entered service in 1992.
4 June – A MiG-29 fighter crashed and was completely destroyed in Astrakhan Oblast. Both pilots parachuted to safety.
4 June – An unarmed Su-34 bomber in Voronezh Oblast overshot the runway when its parachute failed to open on landing. It overturned, severely damaging the plane.
8 June – A Tupolev Tu-95 ran off a runway at Ukrainka Air Base, Amur Oblast and caught fire during take-off. One crew member was killed and another badly burned.
3 July - A MiG-29 Fulcrum multirole jet fighter crashed in Krasnodar Krai. The pilot was able to catapult before the crash and was found later by a search team. It was pointed out that a technical failure and pilot error are considered as the most possible reasons of the crash.
5 July – A MiG-29 crashed in Krasnodar Krai reportedly due to a fire on board. The pilot ejected and survived.
6 July – A Sukhoi Su-24M Fencer frontal strike-bomber crashed in Khabarovsk Krai soon after takeoff. Both pilots died.
13 July – A barracks collapsed at a training facility for paratroopers near Omsk. 23 soldiers died, 19 were hospitalised and three sustained minor injuries. The barracks in the town of Svetlyy had been renovated in 2013–2014.
14 July – A Tupolev Tu-95MS Bear strategic bomber crashed during a training flight 80 km from Khabarovsk, killing two of seven pilots.

2016 
26 March - During takeoff, a fire developed in the no. 2 engine of an Antonov An-26RT , forcing the crew to abort the takeoff. The fire could not be brought under control quickly, causing the engine to separate from its mounts. The engine nacelle, wing and right hand fuselage sustained serious fire damage.
29 April – The decommissioned Soviet-era  nuclear submarine K-173 Krasnoyarsk caught fire while being disassembled in Vilyuchinsk, Kamchatka. The Defence Ministry reported that its rubber-coated outer hull caught fire. The vessel had been built in 1983 and launched in 1986 as part of the Soviet Union’s Pacific Fleet.
19 May – Six soldiers died and 16 were injured when their bus suffered a probable brake failure and left a mountain road in South Ossetia.
9 June – A Sukhoi Su-27 fighter plane crashed 30 km from Moscow. The pilot died. All Su-27s were grounded following the crash.
1 July - An Ilyushin Il-76 firefighting aircraft was destroyed when it impacted wooded terrain 9 km east-southeast from the settlement of Rybnyi Uyan in Irkutsk Oblast. 8 crewmembers and 2 passengers were reported dead.
14 August - A Beriev Be-200ES amphibious jet aircraft sustained damage when it hit the tops of trees while fighting a forest fire near São Pedro do Sul, Portugal. The aircraft had sustained damage to the leading edges of both wings. Also, the right hand wing flaps sustained dents and cuts and the right hand wing float suffered a large hole. No fatalities 
14 November – A MiG-29K crashed in the Mediterranean while attempting to land on the aircraft carrier Admiral Kuznetsov. The pilot safely ejected. The plane was on a training mission for the Russian military intervention in Syria.
3 December -  A Su-33 based on Admiral Kuznetsov crashed while making a second landing attempt after a combat sortie over Syria. The pilot survived without injuries and was immediately recovered by search and rescue teams.[35] According to the Russian Ministry of Defence, the plane was lost after an arresting cable ruptured.
19 December – An Il-18 transport plane belonging to the Russian Defence Ministry crashed in high winds near Tiksi in the Sakha Republic. Initial reports stated that there were some fatalities, but later it turned out that all had survived. 38 were taken to hospital, with four in a critical condition.
25 December – A Tupolev Tu-154 jetliner owned by the Russian Defense Ministry crashed 1.5 km off the coast of Sochi while en route to Khmeimim Air Base in Syria. The aircraft had flown from Chkalovsky Airport, Moscow Oblast and had landed at Sochi to refuel. All 92 passengers and crew aboard died, including Valery Khalilov, artistic director of the Alexandrov Ensemble, and 63 other members of the military choir.

2017 
26 April – A MiG-31 from the Far Eastern Military District crashed during a training flight near the Telemba proving ground in the Republic of Buryatia. Both crew members reportedly ejected safely
27 April – Russian spy ship Liman sank off the Turkish coast, 29 km from Kilyos, after colliding with a freighter in fog. All 78 crew members were rescued.
30 May – An Antonov AN-26 transport crashed at the end of a training flight at the Balashov airbase in Saratov Oblast and caught fire. One crew member died and four were injured. Engine failure was suspected.
10 August – An S-200 Angara anti-aircraft missile exploded at a recycling centre in Chita, Zabaykalsky Krai, having been stolen from a military base and sold for scrap. Two were killed and one person was injured as it was being dismantled. A second missile was also discovered awaiting recycling.
14 September –  A Tupolev Tu-22M, of the 326th Heavy Bomber Division, overruns the runway at Shaykovka, Kaluga Oblast, and is damaged beyond repair. No deaths
28 September – A Tu-22M3 "Backfire" bomber was badly damaged when it aborted takeoff when a speed sensor failed. It ran off the runway, losing a wing, in Shaykovka, Kaluga Oblast. It was taking part in the Zapad ("West") military exercises. No injuries were reported among the four-man crew.
10 October – A Sukhoi Su-24M crashes during takeoff at Khmeimim Air Base, Latakia province, Syria supposedly due to technical malfunction. Both crew members fail to eject and die in the crash.

2018 

6 March – An An-26 transport plane crashed while landing at Hmeimim airbase in Syria. All 39 military personnel on board died. Initial information suggests that a technical problem caused the crash.
17 September – An Ilyushin Il-20 reconnaissance plane was shot down by friendly Syrian forces about 22 miles from the Syrian coast as the Il-20 returned to Hmeimim airbase. 15 Russians died.
30 October – The aircraft carrier Admiral Kuznetsov was damaged while undergoing a refit: the dry dock sank, sending a 70-tonne crane crashing onto the ship and causing a 5m gash. One ship-worker went missing and four required medical care after falling into the sea near Murmansk.

2019 
22 January – A Tu-22M3 bomber crashed as it was approaching to land at Olenya air base, Murmansk Oblast. Russia’s Defense Ministry reported that three crewmembers died and one pilot was injured.
1 July – A navy research submersible, thought to be AS-12 Losharik, suffered a fire and 14 crew members died due to fume inhalation. The vessel had been conducting research in Russia's Arctic territorial waters, according to the Defence Ministry, though Russian media reports said it was a nuclear mini-submarine deployed in special operations.
5 August – A military depot exploded near Achinsk, Krasnoyarsk Krai killing one and injuring at least eight others, and prompting the evacuation of thousands. Russia's Defense Ministry said a fire triggered the explosions at a storage facility for gunpowder charges. Authorities declared a state of emergency in the region. Air traffic was suspended within  of the munitions site.
 8 August – Five military and civilian specialists were killed and three were injured in an explosion at a naval test facility in Arkhangelsk Oblast while testing a liquid jet engine, said to be for the nuclear-powered Burevestnik cruise missile. Earlier the same day there were reports of a fire and explosions at a military facility near Nyonoksa in the same region. The facility has a navy missile test range used to test intercontinental ballistic missiles, cruise missiles and anti-aircraft missiles. The administration in nearby Severodvinsk reported elevated radiation levels for 40 minutes leading to a rush on medical iodine. However, Russia's defence ministry insisted no harmful chemicals had been released.
9 August – Shells again exploded at the Achinsk military depot that saw explosions 4 days prior. Nine were injured. This time the explosions were blamed on a lightning strike.
17 September – A gas explosion occurred at the State Research Center of Virology and Biotechnology VECTOR laboratory in Koltsovo, Novosibirsk Oblast. One worker suffered third-degree burns, and the blast blew out window panes.
25 October – A conscript shot ten fellow soldiers near the village of Gorny, Zabaykalsky Krai, killing eight.
11 December – An Mi-28 attack helicopter crashed in Krasnodar Krai killing two crew members.
12 December – The aircraft carrier Admiral Kuznetsov, caught fire during repair work at Murmansk. Six were injured and one person was reported missing.
17 December – A Tupolev Tu-22M3 long-range bomber suffered a failed engine and sustained damage during an emergency "belly landing" near the Chkalov State Flight Testing Centre in Astrakhan Oblast. Neither of the two-man crew was injured and the nuclear-capable bomber was unarmed.
24 December – A Sukhoi Su-57, the first serial aircraft, crashed near Dzyomgi Airport, Khabarovsk Krai, during the final stage of its factory trials due to malfunction of the control system. The pilot ejected and was recovered by helicopter.

2020s

2020
19 February – A Sukhoi Su-25UB catches fire and burns out at Lipetsk-2 Air Base. Both crew survive.
25 March – A Sukhoi Su-27 crashes into the Black Sea off Belbek, Crimea, killing the pilot.
25 March – An Aero L-39 Albatros crashes in Krasnodar Krai, killing the pilot.
19 May – An Mil Mi-8 helicopter crash-landed in an uninhabited area near Klin, Moscow Oblast, killing all crew members. The Defence Ministry did not reveal how many crew members were on board, but stated that there was no ammunition being carried. The incident might have been caused by a technical malfunction, officials admitted.
 22 September – A Sukhoi Su-30 fighter jet was probably accidentally shot down by a Su-35 fighter jet during exercises near a village in Tver Oblast. The two pilots ejected before the plane crashed and were reported to be in a "stable condition".
7 October – A depot with 75000 tonnes of munitions caught fire, injuring 5 people and causing 2,000 people from nearby villages to be evacuated in Ryazan Oblast, after a wildfire set off explosions. More than 400 firefighters battled the blaze.

2021
23 March – 3 crewmembers died after a Tu-22M strategic bomber’s ejection system suddenly went off at an airfield near Kaluga. Due to the insufficient altitude for parachute opening, three crewmembers received fatal injuries upon landing.
19 June – A L-410 aicraft belonging to DOSAAF that took off from the Tanai airfield crashed into a forest in Kemerovo Oblast. 7 people die and another 17 were injured 
31 July – A SU-35 crashed due to an engine failure in Khabarovsk Krai. the pilot ejected safely.
14 August – A Beriev Be-200 crashed in southeastern Turkey while on a firefighting mission. The 5 Russian military crew members and 3 Turkish forest inspectors were killed in the incident.
17 August – The only flying prototype Il-112V suffered a fire in the right engine and crashed near Kubinka Air base. All 3 crew on board were killed, including test-pilot Nikolai Kuimov, who was awarded the title of Hero of the Russian Federation.
18 August – A MIG-29 crashed in Astrakhan Oblast during a routine flight. The pilot was killed. 
23 August – A MIG-29 catch fire and completely burned during maintenance work in Astrakhan Oblast.
27 August – A SU-24 crashed in Perm. The 2 pilots ejected and only suffer minor injures  
7 September – Emergencies Minister Yevgeny Zinichev died "in the course of an interdepartmental exercise" near Norilsk, Krasnoyarsk Krai while trying to save a cameraman, who fell off a cliff into water. The cameraman also died.
22 September – An AN-26 crashed during a technical flight in Khabarovsk Krai. All 6 persons onboard died 
10 October – A L-410 crashed in Tatarstan, killing 16 people and injuring six. The plane belonged to DOSAAF

2022
29 January – A MIG-31 crashed in Novgorod Oblast. the plane split in half and the 2 pilots ejected safely
14 April – The battleship Moskva sank in the Black Sea during hostilities with Ukraine following a fire, as claimed by Russian authorities. Ukraine claimed it sank the ship with a missile. Officially Russia admitted one sailor died, but independent reports suggested 40 may have perished.
22 April – Seven people died following a blaze at a key aerospace defence research institute in Tver. Local authorities said 25 people were also injured in the fire and 10 people were reported to be missing.
22 June – Four people died in an explosion at an ammunition depot in Vladimir Oblast when an object “spontaneously detonated during a loading and unloading operation”. Three victims were soldiers and one was a civilian specialist.
24 June – Five people died and four people were wounded after a Il-76 hit power lines and crashed near Ryazan.
17 October – 13 people died in Yeysk, Krasnodar Krai when a Su-34 fighter jet crashed into an apartment building. It was on a training flight when an engine reportedly caught fire. The two crew members bailed out safely. 19 residents were injured.
23 October – Two pilots were killed when a Sukhoi Su-30 fighter jet crashed into a house in Irkutsk during a test flight. No casualties were reported on the ground.
28 October – Svetlana Babayeva, the bureau chief of the Rossiya Segodnya media group in Simferopol, Russian-occupied Crimea, was killed by a stray bullet while covering shooting practice at a military training ground in Crimea.
2 December – A MIG-31 interceptor aircraft crashed in Primorsky Krai during a training flight, the crew ejected safely 
22 December – Admiral Kuznetsov, Russia's only aircraft carrier caught fire, again, while on repair work in Murmansk. The fire was extinguished rapidly and no casualties were reported

See also
 Nuclear navy for a list of nuclear accidents including Soviet vessels
 The Severomorsk Disaster in 1984
 Dedovshchina – bullying in the Russian army.
 Komsomolets Nuclear Submarine Memorial Society
 List of Chinese military accidents
 List of Russian aircraft losses in the Second Chechen War

References

Non-combat military accidents
Military Accidents
Accidents
Accidents